Omladinski košarkaški klub Spars, commonly referred to as OKK Spars or Spars Ilidža, is a men's professional basketball club based in Ilidža, Bosnia and Herzegovina. The club competes in the Basketball Championship of Bosnia and Herzegovina and the ABA League Second Division.

The club is owned and run by Nihad Selimović and few others.

History
The club was founded in 2005 as OKK Spars and competed in lower-ranking divisions until joining 2nd-tier A1 League in the 2011–12 season. After winning the A1 League in the 2012–13 season, they were promoted to the Basketball Championship of Bosnia and Herzegovina for the 2013–14 season.

In December 2019, the club was merged with Realway, and changed its name to KK Spars Realway. However, on 31 December 2020, Spars and Realway parted their ways and the club changed its name back to OKK Spars.

Sponsorship naming 
Spars has had several denominations through the years due to its sponsorship.
 Spars Ilidža: 2022–present

Logos

Home arenas
 Novo Sarajevo Sports Hall, also known as the Grbavica Sports Hall (2019–2022)
 Arena Hills (2022–present)

Players

Current roster

Trophies and awards

Trophies  
 A1 League (2nd-tier)
 Winners (1): 2012–13
 National Cup     
 Winners (1): 2020

Head coaches 

  Marko Trbić (2010–2018)
  Ivan Opačak (2018)
  Marko Trbić (2018–2019)
  Goran Šehovac (2019)
  Nermin Selimović (2019)
  Nedim Džemić (2020)
  Miodrag Kadija (2021)
  Zoran Kašćelan (2021)
  Miodrag Kadija (2022–present)

Youth system
The club's youth team competes in the Euroleague Basketball Next Generation Tournament. In the 2014–15 edition, Spars were invited to play in Madrid for the tournament's final stage.

References

External links

Team profile at Eurobasket.com

Basketball teams established in 2005
Basketball teams in Bosnia and Herzegovina
2005 establishments in Bosnia and Herzegovina
Sport in Sarajevo